Calochilus ammobius, commonly known as the sand beard orchid, is a species of orchid endemic to Queensland. It has a single leaf which is not present during flowering and up to three dull green flowers with reddish brown streaks and a labellum with a purple "beard".

Description
The lateral sepals are a similar length but narrower. There are purplish hairs covering about three quarters of the labellum. The column has two purple sham "eyes". Flowering occurs from December to February but each flower only lasts a few hours.

Taxonomy and naming
Calochilus ammobius was first formally described in 2002 by David Jones and Bruce Gray and the description was published in The Orchadian from specimens collected near Chewko. The specific epithet (ammobius) is derived from the Ancient Greek words ammos meaning "sand" and bios meaning "life".

Distribution and habitat
The sand beard orchid grows in low forest with Melaleuca viridiflora, shrubs and grass tussocks in a small area near the type location.

References

ammobius
Orchids of Australia
Orchids of Queensland
Plants described in 2002